Vago may refer to:

People
Antal Vágó (1891–1944), Hungarian footballer 
 István Vágó, Hungarian television presenter
 Pierre Vago, French architect

Other
 Vago, West Virginia, a community in the United States
 Laser Vago, a sailing dinghy
El Rincón del Vago, a Spanish-language web portal